Einav is an Israeli settlement organized as a community settlement in the northern West Bank, located adjacent to the Palestinian village of Ramin, whose lands were confiscated in order to construct Einav. It is located on Highway 57 between Avnei Hefetz and Shavei Shomron, the religious Zionist and Orthodox Jewish community is within the municipal jurisdiction of the Shomron Regional Council.

The international community considers Israeli settlements in the West Bank illegal under international law, but the Israeli government disputes this.

History
Israel confiscated 470 dunams of land from the nearby Palestinian village of Ramin in order to construct Einav (and the accompanying bypass roads and military positions), in addition to confiscating 20 dunams from Kafr al-Labad.

The name of the village comes to remember the vineyards that used to be a feature of the surrounding areas and from the nearby Palestinian town of Anabta.

References

Religious Israeli settlements
Populated places established in 1981
1981 establishments in the Israeli Military Governorate
Israeli settlements in the West Bank